New York City has been described as the gay capital of the world, and is home to one of the world’s largest LGBTQ populations and the most prominent. Brian Silverman, the author of Frommer's New York City from $90 a Day, writes that the city has "one of the world's largest, loudest, and most powerful LGBT communities", and "Gay and lesbian culture is as much a part of New York's basic identity as yellow cabs, high-rises, and Broadway theatre". LGBT travel guide Queer in the World states,  "The fabulosity of Gay New York is unrivaled on Earth, and queer culture seeps into every corner of its five boroughs".

In 2022, LGBT advocate and entertainer Madonna stated metaphorically, “Anyways, not only is New York City the best place in the world because of the queer people here. Let me tell you something, if you can make it here, then you must be queer”; and comedian Jerrod Carmichael joked, "That's actually why I live here...if you say you're gay in New York, you can ride the bus for free and they just give you free pizza; if you say you're gay in New York, you get to host Saturday Night Live. This is the gayest thing you can possibly do. We're basically in an Andy Warhol fever dream right now." In 2022, New York City Mayor Eric Adams announced a billboard campaign to woo Floridians
to a significantly more supportive environment for LGBTQ+ residents in New York. LGBT Americans in New York City constitute the largest self-identifying lesbian, gay, bisexual, and transgender communities by a significant margin in the United States.

Greenwich Village in Lower Manhattan was the site of the 1969 Stonewall uprising, and then spawned several foundational organizations in the emerging gay liberation movement. These events are widely considered to be crucial to the founding of the modern gay rights movement in the United States, as well as having worldwide impact. As of 2005, New York City was home to an estimated 272,493 self-identifying gay and bisexual individuals. The New York metropolitan area had an estimated 568,903 self-identifying LGBT residents. Meanwhile, New York City is also home to the largest transgender population in the United States, estimated at 50,000 in 2018, concentrated in Manhattan and Queens. The following represents a partial list of notable LGBT New Yorkers:

List of LGBT New Yorkers

Architecture
 Charles Renfro – architect, partner at Diller Scofidio + Renfro, faculty member at School of Visual Arts

Academia and research
 Andrew Dolkart – co-founder, NYC LGBT Historic Sites Project; professor,  historic preservation, Columbia Graduate School of Architecture, Planning and Preservation (GSAPP)
 Kevin Nadal – professor of psychology and researcher at John Jay College of Criminal Justice and The Graduate Center of the City University of New York

Aviation and military
 Robina Asti – navy pilot who ran reconnaissance missions out of Midway Island in World War II. Born in Queens and a longtime Manhattan resident, Asti transitioned post-war, and remained a pilot her whole life. She became the Guinness world record holder for oldest active flight instructor in 2020 when she was 99.

Dance
 Bill T. Jones – dancer and choreographer
 Shen Wei – choreographer, artist, and director

Entrepreneurship and technology
 Eva Kotchever – founder of Eve's Hangout in Greenwich Village, deported to Europe and assassinated at Auschwitz
 Bradford Shellhammer – entrepreneur and designer, founding editor of Queerty
 Joel Spolsky – software engineer

Fashion

Design
 Thom Browne – fashion designer
 Drew Elliott – creative director and consultant
 Prabal Gurung – fashion designer
 Marc Jacobs – fashion designer
 Calvin Klein – fashion designer
 Michael Kors – fashion designer
 Derek Lam – fashion designer
 Humberto Leon – fashion designer
 Phillip Lim – fashion designer
 Isaac Mizrahi – fashion designer
 Todd Oldham – fashion designer
 Zac Posen – fashion designer
 Christian Siriano – fashion designer
 Alexander Wang – fashion designer
 Jason Wu – fashion designer

Modeling
 J. Alexander – model and fashion designer
 Leyna Bloom – fashion model and transgender activist
 Cara Delevingne – supermodel and actress
 Peche Di – transgender model, who started the first transgender modeling agency in the U.S., in New York City
 Dilone – model
 Rain Dove – model and activist
 Shay Neary – transgender model, the first transgender plus-size model featured in a major fashion campaign
 Yasmine Petty – transgender model
 Aaron Philip – transgender model
 Teddy Quinlivan – transgender model
 Miriam Rivera – late transgender model and the first openly trans reality television star
 Geena Rocero – supermodel and transgender activist
 Abby Stein – transgender model and rabbi

Film and television
 Desiree Akhavan – film director, producer, and screenwriter
 Casper Andreas – director, writer, and actor
 Brian Balthazar – co-executive producer, The View
 Sandra Bernhard – actress, singer, and author
 Matt Bomer – actor and director
 Joel Kim Booster – actor, comedian, producer, and writer 
 Jerrod Carmichael – actor, comedian, filmmaker
 Candis Cayne – transgender actress
 Margaret Cho – multi-hyphenate entertainer and social activist 
 Bill Condon – director, screenwriter, and producer
 Laverne Cox – transgender actress
 Lee Daniels – director, screenwriter, and producer
 Casey Donovan – late gay pornography actor
 Billy Eichner – actor, comedian, and writer
 Fredrik Eklund – real estate broker, co-star of Million Dollar Listing New York
 Rodney Evans – director and screenwriter
 Frankie Grande – television personality, co-host of Style Code Live
 Tim Gunn – fashion consultant, television personality and actor
 Dominique Jackson – transgender actress and model
 Punkie Johnson – actress, comedian, writer, Saturday Night Live
 Jari Jones – transgender filmmaker and producer
 Michael Patrick King – director, writer, and producer
 Carson Kressley – television personality, former host of Queer Eye for the Straight Guy
 John Krokidas – director, writer, and producer
 Jennie Livingston – documentary filmmaker
 Chella Man – artist, actor, and transgender model
 Rob Marshall – director, choreographer and producer
 Kate McKinnon – comedian, actor
 John Cameron Mitchell – director, writer, and actor
 Janet Mock – TV host, writer, and transgender rights activist
 Indya Moore – transgender actor and model
 Lauren Morelli – screenwriter
 Cynthia Nixon – actress
 Wolé Parks – actor
 Stacie Passon – director, screenwriter, and producer
 Kal Penn – actor
 Patrik-Ian Polk – director, screenwriter, and producer
 Zachary Quinto – actor and producer
 Dee Rees – director, screenwriter, and producer
 Erik Rhodes (James Elliott Naughtin) – late gay pornography actor, amateur bodybuilder
 Yoruba Richen – documentary filmmaker
 Michaela Jaé Rodriguez – transgender actress
 Harmony Santana – transgender actress
 Greta Schiller – documentary filmmaker
 Jonathan Van Ness – non-binary television personality
 John Waters – director, actor, and writer
 Rutina Wesley – actress
 Samira Wiley – actress and model
 Bowen Yang – writer and actor, Saturday Night Live

Law
 Paul Feinman – first openly gay judge confirmed to the New York State Court of Appeals, in June 2017
 Roy Cohn – closeted lawyer who prosecuted those accused of being homosexuals and communists during the Lavender scare and Second Red Scare

Literature
 Hilton Als – writer and theater critic.
 Ellis Avery – late author
 James Baldwin – late novelist, playwright, essayist, poet, and activist.
 James Beard – late culinary author and chef
 Bruce Benderson – author
 Jennifer Finney Boylan – trans author and journalist
 Augusten Burroughs – author, memoirist
 Regie Cabico – poet and spoken-word artist
 Michael Cunningham – author
 Samuel R. Delany – late author
 Nicole Dennis-Benn – author
 Thomas M. Disch – late author
 Mark Doty – poet and memoirist
 Martin Duberman – biographer and historian
 Cyrus Grace Dunham – author
 David Ebershoff – author and editor
 Allen Ginsberg – late poet, philosopher, and writer
 Paul Lisicky – author and memoirist
 Jaime Manrique – poet, essayist, and translator
 Eric Marcus – author
 Darnell L. Moore – author
 Lesléa Newman – author and editor
 Frank O'Hara – late New York School (art) poet
 Rakesh Satyal – author
 Ariel Schrag – cartoonist and television writer
 Sarah Schulman – author
 Charles Silverstein – author, therapist, and gay activist
 Susan Sontag – late writer, filmmaker, philosopher, teacher, and political activist
 Colm Tóibín – author, journalist, critic
 Edmund White – author, critic, and memoirist

Media

 Yashar Ali – journalist, New York magazine
 Jack Anderson – dance critic and author
 Rose Arce – journalist and producer
 Michael Ausiello – journalist, multiple media platforms 
 Josh Barro – journalist and senior editor, Business Insider
 Keith Boykin – syndicated columnist
 Ben Brantley – journalist and chief theater critic, The New York Times
 Frank Bruni – journalist and op-ed columnist, The New York Times
 Sam Champion – meteorologist and television weather anchor
 Andy Cohen – television personality
 Anderson Cooper – journalist and television anchor, CNN
 Angela Dimayuga – food critic for The New York Times, chef
 George Dorris – editor and writer
 David W. Dunlap – journalist, The New York Times
 Ronan Farrow – journalist and lawyer
 Stephanie Gosk – journalist, NBC News
 Perez Hilton – blogger
 Sally Kohn – journalist, political commentator
 Steve Kornacki – writer and political correspondent with NBC News
 Don Lemon – journalist and television anchor,  CNN
 Bryan Llenas – journalist, Fox News
 Michael Lucas – journalist, The Advocate and HuffPost; director, businessman, actor, and activist
 Rachel Maddow – journalist and television anchor, MSNBC
 Stephen Morgan – meteorologist, Fox Weather
 Adam Moss – writer and editor, New York magazine
 Michael Musto – journalist
 Jim Nelson – editor, GQ magazine
 Rosie O'Donnell – television personality
 Richard Quest – journalist, CNN International
 Robin Roberts – journalist and television anchor, Good Morning America
 Thomas Roberts – TV journalist and news anchor
 Steven Romo – anchor, NBC News, MSNBC
Dave Rubin – political commentator, YouTube personality, talk show host, and author
Nate Silver – writer, statistician, and founder/editor of FiveThirtyEight
 Shepard Smith – journalist and anchor, formerly of FOX News and CNBC
 André Leon Talley – late fashion journalist, Vogue
 Andy Towle – blogger, political commentator, and founder of Towleroad
 Justin Wee – photojournalist, The New York Times
 Jann Wenner – co-founder and publisher, Rolling Stone
 Jenna Wolfe – journalist and TV news host

Music
 Adult Mom – singer and songwriter
 Michael Alig – musician, club promoter, convicted murderer
 Angel Haze – rapper and songwriter
 Azealia Banks – rapper/singer
 Mykki Blanco – transgender rapper, performance artist, poet, and activist
 Mal Blum – singer and songwriter
 Dai Burger – rapper
 Cakes da Killa – rapper
 Cardi B – rapper
 Cazwell – rapper
 DJ Keoki – electronic musician
 Frankie Knuckles – late house DJ and producer
 House of Ladosha – rap duo (Antonio Blair and Adam Radakovich) and artistic collective
 Lady Gaga – singer and songwriter
 Le1f – rapper and producer
 Larry Levan – late, pioneering house DJ and producer
 Stephin Merritt – musician and songwriter with The Magnetic Fields, writer of the music and lyrics of Coraline (musical)
 Jonte' Moaning – singer, songwriter, dancer, and choreographer
 Princess Nokia – rapper and musician
 Jake Shears – singer and songwriter
 Will Sheridan – singer and musician
 St. Vincent – singer-songwriter, musician
 Brad Walsh – singer and music producer

Nightlife

Ballroom
 Erickatoure Aviance – ballroom performer (House of Aviance)
 Kevin Aviance – drag queen, musician, and performance artist (House of Aviance)
 Mother Juan Aviance – ballroom performer (founder of the House of Aviance)
 Crystal LaBeija – late drag queen (founder of the House of LaBeija)
 Pepper LaBeija – late drag queen and fashion designer (House of LaBeija)
 Leiomy Maldonado – transgender ballroom performer (House of Amazon)
 Willi Ninja – late ballroom performer known as "the godfather of voguing" (founder of the House of Ninja)
 Hector Xtravaganza – late dancer, choreographer, and voguer (House of Xtravaganza)
 Venus Xtravaganza – late transgender performer and voguer (House of Xtravaganza)

Drag
 Acid Betty – drag queen (contestant on the eighth season of RuPaul's Drag Race)
 Aja – drag queen (contestant on the ninth season of RuPaul's Drag Race) and rapper
 Alexis Michelle – singer and drag queen (contestant on the ninth season of RuPaul's Drag Race)
 Aquaria – drag queen and performance artist (winner of the tenth season of RuPaul's Drag Race)
 Joey Arias – drag queen and performance artist
 Bianca Del Rio – drag queen (winner of the sixth season of RuPaul's Drag Race)
 Bob the Drag Queen – drag queen and performance artist (winner of the eighth season of RuPaul's Drag Race)
 Lee Brewster – late drag queen, homophile, transvestite activist, founder of Queens Liberation Front
 Brita Filter – drag queen (contestant on the twelfth season of RuPaul's Drag Race), actor, and star of Shade: Queens of NYC
 Dallas DuBois – former drag queen
 Hedda Lettuce – drag queen and singer
 Honey Davenport – activist, singer, and drag queen (contestant on the eleventh season of RuPaul's Drag Race)
 Jackie Cox – drag queen (contestant on the twelfth season of RuPaul's Drag Race)
 Jan Sport – drag queen (contestant on the twelfth season of RuPaul's Drag Race)
 Jasmine Kennedie - drag queen (contestant on the fourteenth season of "Rupaul's Drag Race" )
 Jiggly Caliente – transgender singer, actress, activist, and drag queen (contestant on the fourth season of RuPaul's Drag Race)
 Kandy Muse – drag queen, contestant on the thirteenth season of RuPaul's Drag Race
 Lady Bunny – drag queen and founder Wigstock event
 Lypsinka – drag queen, writer, musician, and performance artist
 Manila Luzon – drag queen (contestant on the third season of RuPaul's Drag Race and the fourth season of RuPaul's Drag Race All Stars)
 Milk – drag performer (contestant on the sixth season of RuPaul's Drag Race) and fashion model
 Miss Fame – drag queen (contestant on the seventh season of RuPaul's Drag Race)
 Miz Cracker – drag queen (contestant on the tenth season of RuPaul's Drag Race)
 Monét X Change – drag queen (winner of the fourth season of RuPaul's Drag Race All Stars)
 Murray Hill – drag king and performance artist
 Paige Turner – drag performer and star of Shade: Queens of NYC
 Pearl – drag queen (contestant on the seventh season of RuPaul's Drag Race)
 Peppermint – drag queen (contestant on the ninth season of RuPaul's Drag Race) and star of Head Over Heels
 Rosé – drag queen, contestant on the thirteenth season of RuPaul's Drag Race
 RuPaul – drag queen and star of the RuPaul's Drag Race series
 Sahara Davenport – late singer and drag queen (contestant on the second season of RuPaul's Drag Race)
 Sasha Velour – drag performer (winner of the ninth season of RuPaul's Drag Race)
 Shequida – drag artist, writer, and opera singer
 Sherry Vine – drag queen and musician
 Shuga Cain – drag queen (contestant on the eleventh season of RuPaul's Drag Race)
 Tina Burner – drag queen (contestant on the thirteenth season of RuPaul's Drag Race and star of Shade: Queens of NYC)
 Yuhua Hamasaki – drag queen (contestant on the tenth season of RuPaul's Drag Race)

Other
 Juliana Huxtable – transgender performer, artist, and writer
 Amanda Lepore – transgender performance artist
 Klaus Nomi – late countertenor and nightlife performance artist

Politics
 Erik Bottcher – member of the New York City Council (January 2022 to present)
 Tiffany Caban - elected to the New York City Council representing western Queens (2022 to present)
 David Carr – first openly gay Republican member of the New York City Council
 Daniel Dromm – member of the New York City Council (January 2010 to January 2022)
 Thomas Duane – the first openly gay member of the New York State Senate, in which he served from 1999 to 2012 and former New York City Council member (1991 to 1999)
 Sarah Kate Ellis – CEO, GLAAD
 Deborah J. Glick – member of the New York State Assembly, the 66th Assembly District in Manhattan (1991–present)
 Brad Hoylman – Democratic Senator for the New York State Senate in Manhattan's 27th district (2012–present)
 Crystal Hudson – elected to the New York City Council representing Brooklyn (2022 to the present)
 Corey Johnson – Speaker of the New York City Council (January 2018 to January 2022) and member of the NYC Council (January 2014 to January 2022)
 Kristin Richardson Jordan – elected to the New York City Council representing northern Manhattan (2022 to present)
 Ed Koch – late Mayor of New York City, 1978 to 1989
 Margarita López – first openly lesbian and female Puerto Rican elected to the New York City Council, serving from 1998 through 2006
 Carlos Menchaca – member of the New York City Council (January 2014 to January 2022) and first Mexican American elected to a statewide New York political office
 Rosie Méndez – member of the New York City Council (January 2006– January 2018)
 Daniel J. O'Donnell – first openly gay male elected as a member of the New York State Assembly (January 2002 to present), the 69th district in Manhattan
 Chi Ossé – youngest ever member of the New York City Council to be elected, in 2021 at age 23
 Antonio Pagán – first openly gay male and Puerto Rican elected to the New York City Council, serving from 1994 through 1998; former New York City Commissioner of Small Businesses (1998–2002)
 Christine Quinn – first female and first openly lesbian or gay Speaker of the New York City Council (January 2006 to January 2014) and member of NYC Council (1999 to 2014)
 Phil Reed – first openly gay male and African American elected to the New York City Council (1998–2006)
 George Santos - U.S. congressman from New York's 3rd district (2023–present)
 Matthew Titone –  elected Richmond County Surrogate Court Judge of Staten Island in 2018 and member of the New York State Assembly (2006 to 2018) from the 61st District, on Staten Island
 Ritchie Torres – U.S. congressman from New York's 15th district (2019–present); City Councilor (2014–2019)
 James Vacca – former member of the New York City Council
 Jimmy Van Bramer – Majority Leader of the New York City Council
 Randi Weingarten – president, American Federation of Teachers

Social activism
 Stormé DeLarverie – Drag king, M.C., security worker, believed by many to have instigated the Stonewall uprising
 Brian Ellner – LGBT rights activist and executive vice president for public affairs at Edelman
 Marsha P. Johnson – gay liberation activist, Stonewall combatant, member of the Gay Liberation Front (GLF), co-founder of Street Transvestite Action Revolutionaries (STAR)
 Sylvia Rivera – gay liberation and trans activist, participant in GLF actions, co-founder of Street Transvestite Action Revolutionaries

Sports
 Brian Anderson – skateboarder

Theatre

 Michael Arden – director, actor, and singer
 Jon Robin Baitz – playwright, screenwriter, and producer
 Anne Bogart – director
 David Burtka – Broadway and television actor, chef
 Charlie Carver – Broadway and television actor
 Jenn Colella – actress
 Roberta Colindrez – actress and writer
 Quentin Crisp – late stage actor, raconteur, and writer
 Mart Crowley – late playwright
 Jim David – comedian, actor, playwright
 Robin de Jesús – actor
 Harvey Fierstein – actor, playwright, and screenwriter
 Richard Greenberg – playwright and screenwriter
 Jonathan Groff – Broadway and television actor, co-star, "Glee"
 Jeremy O. Harris – actor and playwright
 Neil Patrick Harris – Broadway and television actor, producer, singer, comedian, magician, and television host
 Brian Hutchison – actor
 Cheyenne Jackson – actor and singer
 Larry Kramer – late playwright, author, producer, and LGBT rights advocate
 Tony Kushner – playwright and screenwriter
 Matteo Lane – comedian
 Nathan Lane – actor and comedian
 Joe Mantello – director and actor
 Keith McDermott – actor, director and memoirist
 Danny McWilliams – actor and comedian
 Andy Mientus – actor, Broadway musicals
 Javier Muñoz – actor, singer, and HIV/AIDS activist
 Rory O'Malley – actor and singer
 Lee Pace – actor
 Jim Parsons – Broadway and television actor, co-star, The Big Bang Theory
 Billy Porter – actor and singer
 Andrew Rannells – actor and singer
 Conrad Ricamora – multiple-award winning Broadway and screen actor
 Ben Levi Ross – actor
 Jordan Roth – majority owner, Jujamcyn Theaters on Broadway
 Wesley Taylor – actor and writer
 Taylor Trensch – actor
 Tuc Watkins – stage and screen actor

Visual arts
 Cass Bird – photographer and artist
 Andrew Bolton – head curator, the Metropolitan Museum of Art's Costume Institute
 Anthony Goicolea – artist chosen in June 2017 to design the official New York State LGBT monument
 Keith Haring – late artist
 Annie Leibovitz – photographer
 Robert Mapplethorpe – late photographer
 Larry Rivers – late painter, sculptor
 Carter Smith – fashion photographer
 Sam Wagstaff – art curator
 Andy Warhol – late artist

See also

 Culture of New York City
 Drag ball culture
 Gay Asian & Pacific Islander Men of New York
 Homosocialization
 LGBT Americans
 LGBT culture in New York City
 LGBT history in New York
 LGBT rights in New York
 LGBT rights in the United States
 New York City demographics
 New York City Gay Men's Chorus
 Queens Liberation Front
 Pose
 The Queen
 The Boys in the Band

References

Further reading
 
 

LGBT people from New York (state)
Lists of people from New York City
Lists of American LGBT people